Dmytro Mazurchuk (born January 19, 1999, in Kremenets, Ukraine) is a Ukrainian Nordic combined skier and former ski jumper. He competed at the 2022 Winter Olympics. He is bronze medallist of the 2023 Winter World University Games.

Career
Mazurchuk started his international career when he competed at the 2015 European Youth Olympic Winter Festival in Tschagguns, Austria, where he was 29th in the NH/10 km competition. At the beginning of his sporting career, Mazurchuk also competed in ski jumping, but those were only FIS Cup competitions. He last started as a ski jumper in September 2018.

At the 2016 Winter Youth Olympics in Norwegian Lillehammer, he was 7th in the NH/5 km competition.

Mazurchuk participated at five Junior World Championships between 2015 and 2019. His best personal results were 14th in HN/5 km and NH/10 km competitions in Swiss Kandersteg in 2018. Afterwards, he participated at three World Championships.

Mazurchuk debuted at the World Cup on January 13, 2018, in Italian Val di Fiemme where he was 16th in men's team sprint (together with Pasichnyk). His first individual World Cup race took place on November 30, 2018, in Norwegian Lillehammer, where he was 55th. As of January 2023, Mazurchuk's best individual World Cup result was 30th on January 9, 2022, in Val di Fiemme, Italy. His best personal Continental Cup result remains 8th rank from December 4, 2021, in Chinese Zhangjiakou.

In 2022, Mazurchuk was nominated for his first Winter Games in Beijing. He participated at both individual events. His best finish was 32nd in the large hill/10 km competition.

At the 2023 Winter World University Games, Mazurchuk finished 5th in the normal hill/10 km and 7th in the mass start 10 km/normal hill. On 17 January, he won a bronze medal in the team sprint event with Vitalii Hrebeniuk, which was the first-ever medal for Ukraine in this sport at the Winter Universiades. He represented Lviv State University of Physical Culture.

Results

Olympic Games

World Championships

References

External links
  (as Nordic Combined skier)
  (as ski jumper)

1999 births
Living people
Ukrainian male Nordic combined skiers
Ukrainian male ski jumpers
Nordic combined skiers at the 2016 Winter Youth Olympics
Nordic combined skiers at the 2022 Winter Olympics
Olympic Nordic combined skiers of Ukraine
Universiade medalists in nordic combined
Universiade bronze medalists for Ukraine
Competitors at the 2023 Winter World University Games
Medalists at the 2023 Winter World University Games
21st-century Ukrainian people